The enzyme [pyruvate kinase]-phosphatase (EC 3.1.3.49) catalyzes the reaction

[pyruvate kinase] phosphate + HO  [pyruvate kinase] + phosphate

This enzyme belongs to the family of hydrolases, specifically those acting on phosphoric monoester bonds.  The systematic name of this enzyme class is [ATP:pyruvate 2-O-phosphotransferase]-phosphate phosphohydrolase. This enzyme is also called pyruvate kinase phosphatase.

References

 

EC 3.1.3
Enzymes of unknown structure